"Neon Light" is a song written by Andrew Dorff, Mark Irwin and Josh Kear and recorded by American country music artist Blake Shelton. It was released to country radio on August 18, 2014, as the lead single to his eighth studio album Bringing Back the Sunshine. The album was released on September 30, 2014.

Content
The song is a mid-tempo with a "pulsing drum loop" and "banjo, acoustic guitar, and Telecaster piling on layer by layer". It is about a man who heads to a bar after a breakup and states that "there's a neon light at the end of the tunnel".

Critical reception
Jon Freeman of Country Weekly gave the song a "B". He called the song "a move back toward center and the more traditional country fare that launched his career" but criticized the repetition of the lyrics on the verses.

Commercial performance
The song was certified Gold by the RIAA on January 5, 2015. It has sold 526,000 copies in the US as of January 2015.

Music video
The music video was directed by Cody Kern and premiered on 12 September 2014.

Charts

Year-end charts

Certifications

References

2014 songs
2014 singles
Blake Shelton songs
Song recordings produced by Scott Hendricks
Songs written by Andrew Dorff
Songs written by Mark Irwin (songwriter)
Songs written by Josh Kear
Warner Records Nashville singles